In the Storm is the third studio album by El DeBarge released in 1992 on Warner Bros. Records. The album got to No. 22 on the Blues & Soul Top UK Soul Albums chart.

Overview
In The Storm was produced by both El DeBarge and Maurice White. 
Artists such as Prince, Patti LaBelle, Chante Moore and Kool Moe Dee also appeared upon the album.

Critical reception

Geoff Brown of Vox gave a 7 out of 10 rating and declared "Still, it's the best album I've heard by a DeBarge". 
Ken Capobianco of The Boston Globe noted that "El DeBarge's third solo flight adds a heavier funk accent to his usual R&B. He co-produced it with Maurice White and they've come up with a punchy mix of bass heavy jams and seductive ballads. Greg Simms of the Dayton Daily News gave a four out of five stars rating and exclaimed "On an album produced by El DeBarge and Maurice White, the former has teamed up with a group of splendid musicians to create an absolute masterpiece." Simms added "This album is about as good as pop music gets." People wrote "DeBarge’s first album in three years is something of a milestone. As he turns 30 and finally sheds his cutie-pie teen idol image, the singer joins a new label in a new funkier style." With a 3.5 out of 5 stars rating Don Mayhew of the Fresno Bee found that "This seems awfully derivative upon first listen, but further exploration reveals an intricate 19-track synthesis of old-school horns and guitars woven together with new jack swing percussion and sound bites". Craig Lytle of Allmusic gave a three out of five star rating stating "Aside from the Marvin Gaye undertones, this collection of songs is well written and produced. It is free of the typical and predictable rhythms of the day." Chuck Eddy of Rolling Stone proclaimed  "El's In the Storm defies all expectations". He also added "It's a song cycle. And like most such animals, especially ones that rely on studio clutter, the music comes off a bit disjointed at first. But before long you surrender to the sheer wash of sound--meshes of high-pitched church voices; audacious "interludes" of electric wah-wah funk, piano-boogie jazz and liquid salsa; extravagant strings dousing sax solos." Lynn Dean Ford of the Indianapolis Star said "Still this disc, co-produced by Earth, Wind & Fire's Maurice White, comes highly recommended as a decent slice of retro funk and soul with some poignant social messages".

Singles
A cover of Marvin Gaye's "After The Dance" with Fourplay rose to number 2 upon the US Billboard Hot Soul Songs chart. "You Know What I Like" also got to number 14 upon the US Billboard Hot Soul Songs chart.

Track listing
All songs written by El DeBarge, except as noted.

 "Elmo Funk" (Prelude) - 0:54
 "Fast Lane (featuring Kool Moe Dee)" (El DeBarge, Mohandas Dewese) - 5:05
 "After the Dance (vocal)" (Marvin Gaye) - 6:02
 "My Heart Belongs to You" (Keith Crouch) - 5:08
 "Cry" (Interlude) - 0:21
 "Love Me Tonight" - 6:15
 "Sincerely Yours" (Interlude) - 0:58
 "You Know What I Like" - 4:57
 "Tip O' My Tongue" (Kirk Johnson, Paisley Park) - 5:07
 "Soul Searchin'" (Prelude) - 0:22
 "In The Storm" - 5:57
 "And Then I Wrote" (Prelude) - 0:25
 "Thick" - 4:45
 "Another Chance" - 7:51
 "Leggs" - 4:24
 "Elmo Funk" (Interlude) - 2:30
 "You Turn Me On" - 4:23
 "Prelude to Midnight" - 1:55
 "Special" (El DeBarge, Maurice White) - 5:09

Personnel 

 El DeBarge – lead vocals, backing vocals, keyboards, acoustic piano, clavinet, synth bass, percussion
 Keith Crouch – keyboards, synthesizers, clavinet, drum programming, percussion
 Kenneth Crouch – keyboards, drum programming
 Bob James – keyboards (3)
 Harvey Mason, Jr. – synthesizer and computer programming (3)
 Jonathan DuBose – guitar
 Johnny Graham – guitar
 Al McKay – guitar
 Tommy Organ – guitar
 Lee Ritenour – guitar (3)
 Larry Graham – bass
 Joel Smith – bass
 Nathan East – bass (3), backing vocals (3)
 Jimmy Abney – drums, percussion
 Harvey Mason – drums (3)
 Andrew Brown – additional percussion
 Don Myrick – saxophone
 Gary Bias – saxophone
 Reggie Young – trombone
 Raymond Lee Brown – trumpet
 Bill Meyers – horn and string arrangements
 Maurice White – backing vocals
 Kool Moe Dee – guest rap (2)
 Rodney Trotter – backing vocals
 Lester Wilson – backing vocals
 Barbara Wilson – backing vocals
 Brenda Wilson – backing vocals
 Patti LaBelle – backing vocals (3), BGV arrangements (3)
 Darryl DeBarge – backing vocals (3)
 James DeBarge – backing vocals
 The Juice Crew – backing vocals
 Chanté Moore – backing vocals
 Andrew Brown – backing vocals
 Rose Stone –  backing vocals
 Olivia McKurken – backing vocals
 Maxine Anderson – backing vocals
 Val Young – backing vocals
 Rene Small – backing vocals
 Kevin Dorsey – backing vocals

Production 
 El DeBarge – producer (1, 2, 5-19), executive producer
 Maurice White – producer (1, 2, 5-19)
 Rodney Trotter – associate producer (2, 15)
 Fourplay – producers (3)
 Keith Crouch – producer (4)
 Benny Medina – executive producer
 Fred Moultrie – executive producer
 Galen L. Senogles – recording engineer
 Paul Klingberg – recording engineer, mixing
 Eddy Schreyer – mastering

Charts

References

El DeBarge albums
Albums produced by Maurice White
1992 albums
Warner Records albums